The Original Bootlegs is a series of six live albums by Tori Amos, recorded during the Original Sinsuality and Summer of Sin tours, both of which were in support of her 2005 album, The Beekeeper. Two-disc sets were released for each complete show, which were released in three waves of two albums each. On December 6, 2005, a cardboard-housed compilation of all six concerts was released, titled The Original Bootlegs. The albums' cover art is minimal, with artwork featuring animal silhouettes, following the theme of The Beekeeper, which places songs into different metaphorical gardens.

Amos later released a similar series of recordings from her subsequent American Doll Posse Tour, titled Legs and Boots.

Track listings

Auditorium Theatre, Chicago, IL 4/15/05

 Recorded: Auditorium Theatre, Chicago, Illinois, April 15, 2005
 Released: August 30, 2005
 Catalog number: 96442

Royce Hall Auditorium, Los Angeles, CA 4/25/05

 Recorded: Royce Hall Auditorium, Los Angeles, California, April 25, 2005
 Released: August 30, 2005
 Catalog number: 96443

Paramount Theatre, Denver, CO 4/19/05

 Recorded: Paramount Theatre, Denver, Colorado, April 19, 2005
 Released: October 4, 2005
 Catalog number: 97634

Manchester Apollo, Manchester, UK 6/5/05

 Recorded: Manchester Apollo, Manchester, England, June 5, 2005
 Released: October 4, 2005
 Catalog number: 97635

Hammersmith Apollo, London, UK 6/4/05

 Recorded: Hammersmith Apollo, London, England, June 4, 2005
 Released: November 15, 2005
 Catalog number: 97790

B of A Pavilion, Boston, MA 8/21/05

 Recorded: Bank of America Pavilion, Boston, Massachusetts, August 21, 2005
 Released: December 6, 2005
 Catalog number: 97791

Sales and chart performance

The chart above shows the peak positions for the individual The Original Bootlegs releases on the Billboard Top Internet Albums chart. The Paramount Theatre and Manchester Apollo releases charted the week of 29 October 2005 and the Hammersmith Apollo release charted the week of 3 December 2005. Each release placed on the Top Internet Albums chart for a single week.

As of May 2008, the Auditorium Theater and Royce Hall Auditorium releases have sold 7,000 copies each; the Paramount Theater, Manchester Apollo and Hammersmith Apollo releases have sold 5,000 copies each; and the B of A Pavilion release has sold 3,000 copies. The compilation The Original Bootlegs, which includes all six shows, has sold 6,000 copies, according to Nielsen SoundScan.

See also
 The Beekeeper
 Legs and Boots

References

Tori Amos live albums
Live album series
2005 live albums
Epic Records live albums
Albums recorded at the Hammersmith Apollo